This is a list of municipalities in Egypt which have standing links to local communities in other countries. In most cases, the association, especially when formalised by local government, is known as "town twinning" (usually in Europe) or "sister cities" (usually in the rest of the world), and while most of the places included are towns, the list also includes villages, cities, districts, and counties with similar links.

A
Alexandria

 Alicante, Spain
 Almaty, Kazakhstan
 Baltimore, United States
 Bratislava, Slovakia
 Catania, Italy
 Cleveland, United States
 Constanța, Romania
 Durban, South Africa
 Incheon, South Korea
 Kazanlak, Bulgaria
 Limassol, Cyprus
 Odesa, Ukraine
 Paphos, Cyprus
 Port Louis, Mauritius
 Saint Petersburg, Russia
 Shanghai, China
 Thessaloniki, Greece

Aswan

 Chongqing, China
 Sonoma, United States

C
Cairo

 Abu Dhabi, United Arab Emirates
 Amman, Jordan
 Baghdad, Iraq
 Beijing, China
 Damascus, Syria
 East Jerusalem, Palestine
 Istanbul, Turkey
 Kairouan, Tunisia
 Khartoum, Sudan

 Muscat, Oman
 Palermo Province, Italy
 Rabat, Morocco
 Sanaa, Yemen
 Seoul, South Korea
 Stuttgart, Germany 
 Tashkent, Uzbekistan
 Tbilisi, Georgia
 Tokyo, Japan
 Tripoli, Libya

F
Faiyum
 Haikou, China

G
Giza

 Istanbul, Turkey
 Los Angeles, United States

I
Ismailia

 Suzhou, China
 Svishtov, Bulgaria

L
Luxor

 Baltimore, United States
 Brasília, Brazil
 Kakheti, Georgia
 Kazanlak, Bulgaria
 Shenzhen, China
 Viterbo, Italy
 Yangzhou, China

M
Marsa Alam
 Jagodina, Serbia

Minya
 Hildesheim, Germany

P
Port Said

 Bizerte, Tunisia
 Volgograd, Russia

S
Sharm El-Sheikh

 Aqaba, Jordan
 Batumi, Georgia
 Yalta, Ukraine

Suez
 Skopje, North Macedonia

References

Populated places in Egypt
Egypt
Lists of populated places in Egypt
Foreign relations of Egypt